The J. W. Warner House is a historic home in Miami, Florida. It is located at 111 Southwest 5th Avenue. On June 1, 1983, it was added to the U.S. National Register of Historic Places.

References

External links

 Dade County listings at National Register of Historic Places
 Dade County listings at Florida's Office of Cultural and Historical Programs
 
 

Houses on the National Register of Historic Places in Florida
National Register of Historic Places in Miami
Houses in Miami